Tylopilus virens is a bolete fungus in the family Boletaceae found in Asia. It was described as new to science in 1948 by Wei-Fan Chiu as a species of Boletus; Japanese mycologist Tsuguo Hongo transferred it to Tylopilus in 1964. The tubes on the cap underside are up to 2 cm long, while the roundish pores are about 1–2 mm wide. The mushroom is similar in appearance to Tylopilus felleus, but unlike that species, has a greenish cap when young. T. virens typically grows near the conifer species Keteleeria evelyniana. It has elliptical spores measuring 11–14 by 5.5–6 µm.

References

External links

virens
Fungi described in 1948
Fungi of Asia